Jaroslav Kurzweil (7 May 1926, Prague – 17 March 2022) was a Czech mathematician.

Biography
Born in Prague, Czechoslovakia, he was a specialist in ordinary differential equations and defined the Henstock–Kurzweil integral in terms of Riemann sums, first published in 1957 in the Czechoslovak Mathematical Journal. Kurzweil has been awarded the highest possible scientific prize of Czechia, the "Czech Brain" of the year 2006, as an acknowledgement of his life achievements.

With limited opportunities of contact between mathematicians within the Iron Curtain and those from the West, Kurzweil and Ivo Babuška founded a series of international scientific conferences named EQUADIFF, being held every four years since 1962 alternately in Prague, Bratislava, and Brno. He was chief editor of Mathematica Bohemica (then called Časopis pro pěstování matematiky) from 1956 to 1970 and was in its editorial board until 2007. In 2007, Kurzweil delivered a New Year's toast on Czech Television.

See also
 Henstock–Kurzweil integral

References

 Kurzweil, Jaroslav (2012). Generalized Ordinary Differential Equations: Not Absolutely Continuous Solutions. Series in Real Analysis. 11. World Scientific Publishing Company. .
 Jiří Jarník; Štefan Schwabik; Milan Tvrdý; Ivo Vrkoč, Sixty years of Jaroslav Kurzweil. Czechoslovak Mathematical Journal,  Vol. 36 (1986), No. 1, 147–166
 Kurzweil J.. Generalized ordinary differential equations and continuous dependence on a parameter. Czechoslovak Mathe. Journal, 7 (82) 1957, 418–449.

External links
 Jaroslav Kurzweil, Mathematics Genealogy Project
 Biography in Czech

1926 births
2022 deaths
Charles University alumni
Czechoslovak mathematicians
20th-century Czech mathematicians
21st-century Czech mathematicians
Mathematicians from Prague
Recipients of Medal of Merit (Czech Republic)